Sadat Academy for Management Sciences (SAMS) (Arabic:أكاديمية السادات للعلوم الإدارية ʼAkādemyāt ʼal-sādāt lil-ʿoloom al ʼedāriāh),  is an Egyptian Public Academy under the authorization of the Ministry of State for Administrative Development,  SAMS was founded in Egypt in 1981. Its headquarters in Maadi (Corniche el Nile), including The Faculty of Management Sciences (FMS), and The Research and Information Center (RIC), SAMS branch in Ramsis street in Cairo, has the Training Center and Managerial Consultation Center.

Agreements between SAMS and Foreign and Local Organizations

 Agreement with Ministry of Telecommunications and Information Technology, 2005
 Agreement with Development Social Fund, 2005.
 Agreement with Self-Development Institution, Saudi Arabia
 Agreement with University of Potsdam, Germany, first concluded in 1999 and renewed in 2006
 Protocol of Cooperation with Sales Taxation Authority in the fields of training, graduate studies, publications and others
 Agreement with Fulbright on educational and cultural exchange between USA and Egypt, 1998

Educational Programs

Under Graduate Program

SAMS undergraduate program is mainly located in Cairo, Maadi. It is also offered in two of SAMS premises situated in the cities of Port Said, and Dekernes (Delta). It awards bachelor's degree in Management Sciences, accredited by the Supreme Council of Universities Decrees No. 3 of 1986 and No. 110 of 2006.

The following new specializations have been recently introduced:
 Finance
 Investment
 Marketing
 Human Resources
 E-Commerce
 Banking
 Management of Information System (MIS)
 Petroleum & Energy Corporations Management
 Tourism and Hotels Management
 Economics
 Accounting

Academic departments

 Business Administration Department
 Computers and Information Systems Department
 Production and Operation Management Department
 Personnel Administration and Behavioral Sciences Department
 Managerial Law Department
 Public and Local Administration Department
 Economics Department
 Accounting Department
 Languages Department

Academy Branches

 Ramsis
 Port Said
 Dekernes
 Tanta
 Alexandria
 Asiut
 Maadi

External links

 Official Site

Education in Cairo
Universities in Egypt
Educational institutions established in 1981
1981 establishments in Egypt